General Kerr may refer to:

Clayton P. Kerr (1900–1977), U.S. Army major general
James Taggart Kerr (1859–1949), U.S. Army brigadier general
John Brown Kerr (1847–1928), U.S. Army brigadier general
Joseph Kerr (1765–1837), Ohio Volunteers brigadier general
Lord Mark Kerr (British Army officer, born 1676) (1676–1752), British Army general
Lord Mark Kerr (British Army officer, born 1817) (1817–1900), British Army general
Mark Kerr (Royal Navy officer, born 1864) (1864–1944), Royal Air Force major general
Seumas Kerr (born 1953), British Army major general
William Kerr (British Army general) (died 1741), British Army lieutenant general
William Kerr, 2nd Marquess of Lothian (1661–1722), Scottish Dragoons lieutenant general
William Kerr, 4th Marquess of Lothian (1710–1775), Scottish Dragoons general
William Kerr, 5th Marquess of Lothian (1737–1815). British Army general

See also
Attorney General Kerr (disambiguation)